Help is a word meaning to give aid or signal distress.

Help may refer to:

Arts, entertainment, and media

Films 
 Help (2010 film), a Bollywood horror film
 Help (2021 theatrical film), a British psychological thriller film
 Help! (film), a 1965 film directed by Richard Lester starring The Beatles
 Help (2021 television film), a TV film about the COVID-19 pandemic
 The Help (film), a 2011 period drama, set in Jackson, Mississippi, in 1963

Television 
 Help (Australian TV series), a documentary series
 Help (Dutch TV series), a drama series
 Help (British TV series), a comedy series
 H.E.L.P., a 1990 American TV drama series
 The Help (TV series), a 2004 American sitcom
 Dr. Henry's Emergency Lessons for People, also known as H.E.L.P.!, a 1979 American series of animated public service announcements

Episodes
 "Help" (Buffy episode)
 "Help", an episode of The Protector

Literature 
 Help! (magazine)
 Help!! (manga)
 The Help, a historical novel by Kathryn Stockett

Music 

 Help (band), an American rock band

Albums 
 The Help Album, a musical compilation album to benefit the War Child charity
 Help (Thee Oh Sees album)
 Help!, the 1965 Beatles album which includes songs from the film of the same name
 Help! (Brandon Lake album)
 Help! (George Martin album)
 Help, by Blackbear

Songs 
 "Help" (Papa Roach song), 2017
 "Help", a song from Hurts' 2013 album Exile
 "Help", a song from Lil Wayne's 2020 album Funeral (deluxe edition)
 "Help", a song from Lloyd Banks' 2006 album Rotten Apple
 "Help", a song from London Grammar's 2013 album If You Wait
 "Help", a song from Pink Guy's 2017 album Pink Season
 "Help!" (song), a 1965 song by The Beatles
 "Help!", a song from Brandon Lake's 2022 album of the same name

Computing and technology
 Help (command), a command in various command-line shells that invokes documentations and helping information
 Help desk, a point of contact between product users and technical support
 Online help, documentation that accompanies computer application software
 Context-sensitive help, a kind of online help that is obtained from a specific point in the state of the software, providing help for the situation that is associated with that state

Other uses
Help (dog) (1878–1891), Scotch collie dog used to collect charitable donations
Help Remedies, a pharmaceutical company
The help, a pejorative term for domestic workers

Acronyms
 Heat escape lessening position, a way to position oneself to reduce heat loss in cold water
 Higher Education Loan Programme, an Australian government loan scheme for students
 Hydrologic Evaluation of Landfill Performance, a model developed by the United States Environmental Protection Agency
 United States Senate Committee on Health, Education, Labor and Pensions

See also 

 Helping behavior
 Emergency, a situation which poses a dangerous risk of health, life, property, or environment
 Emergency telephone numbers around the world
 Hue and cry, a shouted command to arrest a felon
 Distress signal, a message from a person or a craft such as a ship or airliner to inform others it is in difficulty
 Mayday (distress signal)
 SOS
 Signal for Help
 Assistance (disambiguation)
 Help me (disambiguation)
 HELP University, Malaysia
 HELLP Syndrome, a medical condition affecting pregnant women